Ahmed Hammoud (born 12 July 1991) is a Moroccan actor. He is best known for the roles in the films 13 Hours, Mimosas and Zanka Contact.

Career
He started acting career with several commercial advertisements. Then in 2016, he was selected for a minor role in the American biographical action thriller war film 13 Hours: The Secret Soldiers of Benghazi directed by Michael Bay. He played the role of 'Attacker at Embassy'. Filming began on April 27, 2015 in Malta and Morocco and the film was released on January 15, 2016, by Paramount Pictures. The film later received an Oscar nomination for Best Sound Mixing at the 89th Academy Awards.

With the success of the film, he was then selected for the lead role in the drama film Mimosas directed by Oliver Laxe. In the film, he played one of the lead role 'Ahmed'. The film was produced as a collaborative work between Spain, Morocco, France and Qatar. It was screened in the International Critics' Week section at the 2016 Cannes Film Festival and later won the Nespresso Grand Prize.

In 2017, he joined the French television serial The Bureau with the role 'Djihadiste Botte'. In 2020, he starred in the French drama film Home Front and played the supportive role 'Idir'.

Filmography

References

External links
 

Living people
Moroccan theatre directors
Moroccan film actors
1991 births